Zhang Zongxun (7 February 1908 – 14 September 1998) was a general of the People's Liberation Army of China.

Career
Zhang was born in Weinan, Shaanxi Province on 7 February 1908. He was enrolled in Whampoa Military Academy in 1926, and joined the Communist Party of China in the same year.

Zhang was the head of the 12th army group of Chinese Red Army, the principal and Political commissar of the Red Army University in Ruijin, the chief of staff of the 4th army of the Red 4th army group, the chief of staff of Red Army University, and the head of the 1st bureau of central military commission. During the Second Sino-Japanese War, he was the head of the 358 brigade, affiliated with the 120 division of the Eighth Route Army. In 1945, he became the commander and political commissar of the Luliang military region. He later became the vice commander of the Northwest Field Army, vice commander of the First Field Army and vice commander of the Northwest Military Region.

He participated in many famous battles, and was regarded as one of "Ten Anti-Japan Generals" of CPC.  He was awarded the General (Shang Jiang) rank in 1955.

He was promoted to the deputy chief of staff of PLA, the director of the department of military academy and the vice-director of the department of training superintendence. In 1971, he was appointed as the vice commander of Jinan Military Region. In 1973, he was promoted to the director of the logistics department, until his retirement in 1978. He died on 14 September 1998 at the age of 90.

Family
Zhang Zongxun's son, Zhang Youxia, is a veteran of the 1979 Sino-Vietnamese War, and a top general of the PLA.

References 

1908 births
1998 deaths
People from Weinan
People's Liberation Army generals from Shaanxi
National Revolutionary Army generals from Shaanxi
Victims of the Cultural Revolution